Ben Cronin is a retired Irish rugby union player. He played for Garryowen, Munster, Orrell and also won two caps for Ireland between 1995 and 1997. He mainly played at Number 8 but could also play at flanker. Cronin attended Cistercian College, Roscrea.

Ben Cronin founded KYCKR.COM in Waterford, Ireland in 2007.

References

External links
 Munster Profile

Irish rugby union players
Ireland international rugby union players
Garryowen Football Club players
Munster Rugby players
Living people
1968 births
Ireland international rugby sevens players
Rugby union number eights
People educated at Cistercian College, Roscrea